This is a list of state symbols of Alabama. The items on the list have been officially sanctioned by the Alabama Legislature. Alabama has a total of 41 official state emblems. The oldest of which is the Alabama State Bible, from 1853; the most recently designated is the peach, Alabama's state tree fruit, established in 2006.

The state has no official nickname, although "Heart of Dixie" was strongly promoted by the Alabama Chamber of Commerce in the 1940s and 1950s, and put on state license plates.

Insignia

Species

Geology

Culture

Other

See also
List of Alabama-related topics
Lists of United States state insignia
State of Alabama

References

External links

State symbols
Alabama